The Innocent Casimiro (Italian: L'innocente Casimiro) is a 1945 Italian comedy film directed by Carlo Campogalliani and starring Erminio Macario, Lea Padovani and Olinto Cristina. It is based on a play Scandalo al Collegio by Mario Amendola, and was mainly shot in 1943. However it was disrupted by wartime events and was not released until 1945. It was the first release to be distributed by Lux Film following the Liberation. Critics were generally disappointed with the film, made in the traditional pre-war style of "schoolgirl comedies".

The film's sets were designed by the art directors Gastone Medin and Gino Brosio.

Cast
Erminio Macario as Casimiro Pelagatti
Lea Padovani as Marcella
Olinto Cristina as principal
Enzo Biliotti as Dr. Raglia
Ada Dondini as Zia Tecla
 a Miss Pannelli
Baby Donall as Paola
Lauro Gazzolo as Pietro
Loris Gizzi as Gustavo Corra
Alberto Sordi as Corra's driver
Adriana Serra as Silvia
Paola Veneroni as Emilia
Vinicio Sofia as Professor Polpettone
Amina Pirani Maggi as Casimiro's mother
Giuseppe Pierozzi as the Chadian ding dinger
Letizia Quaranta as Countess Rosselli

References

External links

Italian comedy films
1945 comedy films
Films directed by Carlo Campogalliani
Lux Film films
Italian black-and-white films
1940s Italian films